Beykonak can refer to:

 Beykonak, Kumluca
 Beykonak, Tercan
 Beykonak, Uzunköprü